Tonya Maria Cardoza (born April 2, 1968) is an NCAA women's basketball coach and the former head coach of the Temple University women's basketball team. She previously played basketball for the University of Virginia 1988–1991, and worked as an assistant coach at the University of Connecticut for fourteen seasons before joining the Temple coaching staff in 2008.

Early years
Cardoza grew up in Roxbury, Massachusetts, near Boston, where she played high school basketball at Boston English High, where she earned all-state player honors.

Virginia
Cardoza played for the Virginia Cavaliers between 1987 and 1991. She graduated in 1991 with a degree in anthropology. The team won the Atlantic Coast Conference regular season in 1987, 1988 and 1991. She was named captain her senior year, led the team in scoring with 15.5 points per games, and helped the team reach the 1991 NCAA Women's Division I Basketball Tournament Final Four, where they beat the Connecticut Huskies in the semifinal, then lost in overtime in the championship game. Cardoza was named to the Final Four All-Tournament team along with teammate Dawn Staley.

In the semifinal game against Connecticut, Cardoza was assigned to cover Kerry Bascom, Uconn's best player. Bascom described the defense by Cardoza as like nothing she had ever seen before. In a humorous foreshadowing, on one play, Cardoza was stumbling toward the UConn bench. Head coach Auriemma "playfully ushered her toward a seat with the Huskies"

Cardoza is the holder of several records at Virginia, including:
 Career blocks (110) fifth place
 Season rebounding leader (6.1) 1991 (tied with Staley)
 Career free throws made (338) seventh place
 Career Field Goal percentage (.478) eighth place
 Season Field Goal percentage (.469) 1989
 Season Field Goal percentage (.544) 1991
 Career points (1622) tenth place

Cardoza scored 35 points in a game against Fordham on December 28, 1988.

Professional
Cardoza briefly played in 1992 as a professional basketball player in Segovia, Spain following her graduation from Virginia.

USA Basketball

Cardoza was selected by USA Basketball to play on the U.S. Olympic Festival East team in 1987. The team played four games; in the final game Cardoza scored 13 to help the team win the bronze medal at the event.

Connecticut
Cardoza joined the UConn coaching staff in 1994, the year the Huskies won their first national title.

Cardoza was an accomplished assessor of talent. In 2002, Maria Conlon was the only player from Connecticut on the UConn roster. Head coach Auriemma was not convinced she could be "counted on to contribute on a meaningful level". However, Cardoza shared her assessment with the head coach, "You're looking at our starting point guard next year". Conlon would go on to be the starting point guard for the next two seasons, and helped lead the Huskies to a National Championships in 2004, dishing out six assist and recording zero turnovers in 39 minutes of the championship game.

Temple
In 2008 Dawn Staley, a Virginia teammate of Cardoza, left the Temple head coaching position to take the head coaching position at the University of South Carolina. Cardoza was named to replace Staley as head coach at Temple. Cardoza joked that she was surprised Temple was so good defensively, quipping that Staley hadn't been much of a defensive player in college. But it was a good-natured jab between former teammates. Cardoza and Staley had both played for Virginia in their playing careers. She followed the jab with serious respect, noting that Staley "set the bar". Under Cardoza, the Owls contributed to reach the NCAA tournament for the next three seasons, reaching the second round twice.

When Temple joined the American Athletic Conference, that meant games against Cincinnati as part of the conference schedule. These would not simply be another date in the schedule. Cincinnati is coached by Jamelle Elliott, who played for UConn when Cardoza joined the coaching staff, then coached alongside her when both were assistants under Auriemma. Elliott describes Cardoza simply as "my best friend. I have known her over half my life. She coached me, we talk almost everyday, she is someone I would lay down my life for, I can't describe how close we are." Now they square off as opponents. In their first two meetings each team won once, the Owls winning the first and the Bearcats winning the return game, each team winning on the opponents court.

Cardoza found that the role of head coach was very different than that of an assistant. When she was an assistant, she did have things to worry about but she felt she could step away. As a head coach, she doesn't have that luxury. When she was an assistant, she prided herself on being a players coach, and thought she could always do that, but she has found that the relationship of a head coach to the players is different. She added Willnett Crockett to her staff, whom she had coached while at UConn. Now Crockett, as an assistant coach, fills the role Cardoza used to fill.

On March 22, 2022, Temple announced that Cardoza would not return for the 2022-23 season. She finished her career as Temple's all-time winningest coach with a record of 251-188.

Coaching record

Awards and honors

 2011 Atlantic 10 Coach of the Year   
 2011 Big Five coach of the year   
 2010 Big Five coach of the year   
 2009 Big Five coach of the year

References

External links
 Temple Owls bio

1968 births
Living people
American women's basketball coaches
Basketball coaches from Massachusetts
Basketball players from Boston
UConn Huskies women's basketball coaches
Sportspeople from Boston
Temple Owls women's basketball coaches
Virginia Cavaliers women's basketball players